Mireia Casas Albiach (born 16 April 1969) is a Spanish windsurfer. She competed at the 1992 Summer Olympics and 1996 Summer Olympics.

References

1969 births
Living people
Sportspeople from Barcelona
Spanish female sailors (sport)
Spanish windsurfers
Olympic sailors of Spain
Sailors at the 1992 Summer Olympics – Lechner A-390
Sailors at the 1996 Summer Olympics – Mistral One Design
Mediterranean Games silver medalists for Spain
Competitors at the 1993 Mediterranean Games
Mediterranean Games medalists in sailing
Female windsurfers